Purefoy-Chappell House and Outbuildings is a historic home located at Wake Forest, Wake County, North Carolina.  The house consists of four major sections: a -story, side-gable, single-pile main block with rear shed wing built about 1838; a two-story, side-gable, single-pile addition built about 1895 with vernacular Greek Revival-stylistic influences; a two-room side-gable kitchen / dining building dating to about 1838 that was connected to the main block and the addition by a one-story hyphen containing a modern kitchen added in 1974.  Also on the property are the contributing smokehouse (c. 1838, c. 1900) and doctor's office (c. 1862).

It was listed on the National Register of Historic Places in 2008.

References

Houses on the National Register of Historic Places in North Carolina
Greek Revival houses in North Carolina
Houses completed in 1838
Houses in Wake County, North Carolina
National Register of Historic Places in Wake County, North Carolina
1838 establishments in North Carolina